Hellinsia innocens is a moth of the family Pterophoridae. It is found in Russia (Siberia).

References 

Moths described in 1884
innocens
Moths of Asia